Chander is a given name and surname.

People with the name include:

Surname 
Bhanu Chander, South Indian actor who acted in many Telugu/Tamil movies
Krishan Chander (1914–1977), Urdu and Hindi Afsaana Nigaar, or short story writer

Given name 
Chander Kumar (born 1944), member of the 14th Lok Sabha of India
Chander Mohan, the former Deputy Chief Minister of Haryana State in India
Chander Prakash, (born 1953), Indian general
Nirmal Chander Vij (born 1943), the 21st Indian Chief of Army Staff during 31 Dec 2002 – 31 Jan 2005
Yogesh Chander Deveshwar, the chairman and CEO of ITC Limited, one of India's largest multi-business conglomerates

See also
 Chandra (disambiguation)
 Chandler (surname), of which Chander is a spelling variant